Chris Skrebowski is a well-known commentator on the oil industry and an expert on global oil supply. He is the founding Director of Peak Oil Consulting and consulting editor for Petroleum Review, the magazine of the UK Energy Institute. Skrebowski is also a founding member of the Association for the Study of Peak Oil and Gas (ASPO) and sits on the board of the Oil Depletion Analysis Centre (ODAC). He is a Fellow of the Energy Institute and advises the All Party Parliamentary Group on Peak Oil and Gas (APPGOPO).

Initially sceptical about peak oil predictions, he was persuaded by Colin Campbell of the unreliability of oil reserves data and the risks this posed to energy supply projections. His insight was to recognise that future production flows, rather than oil reserves, were the key determinant of global oil supply. Consequently, he developed Peak Flow Analysis based on the future oil flows identified in his own Global Oil Megaprojects Database. Using this methodology he concluded that major supply/demand imbalances would occur by 2007 with actual peak oil flows occurring no later than 2011.

Skrebowski has 38 years experience in the oil industry, starting work in 1970 as a long-term planner for BP. His career has been divided between industry planning/market analysis and oil journalism. He was Senior Analyst for the Saudi Oil Ministry in London (1985–1994), editor of Petroleum Economist (1994–97) and editor of Petroleum Review (1997–2008). He comments regularly on oil and gas related subjects in the international media.

See also
 Ali Morteza Samsam Bakhtiari
 Kenneth S. Deffeyes
 Richard Heinberg
 Jean Laherrère
 Jeremy Leggett
 Matthew Simmons

References

External links 

 "What they don't want you to know about the coming oil crisis" , The Independent, 20 January 2006.
 "Oil. The fast-vanishing drug the world can't yet live without", The Independent, 7 January 2007.
 "Crunch time for decision makers", The Guardian, 9 February 2007.
 "Coming oil crisis feared", The Guardian.
 "After the Oil Crunch", The New Statesman, 12 June 2008.
 "US Saudi Oil Axis faces Day of Truth", The Telegraph, 19 May 2008.
 "Oil Price Rises Global Shift in Wealth", Washington Post, 10 November 2007.
 "Oilmen admit to looming energy crisis", The New Zealand Herald, 23 July 2007.
 "Oil Prices Will Keep Rising", The Sydney Morning Herald, 21 August 2006.
 "Peak Oil?", Australian Broadcasting Corporation.
 "Running Towards Empty", BBC Radio 4 In Business, 6 May 2004.
 "Please Explain: The Price of Oil", WNYC, 2 June 2006.
 Open Letter to CERA, 21 December 2006.

Living people
1946 births
BP people